Camp Bell is a historic house in Lebanon, Tennessee, U.S.. It was built circa 1835 for William Seawell. It was designed in the Greek Revival architectural style. It was later purchased by the Campbell family, whose son, William B. Campbell, became the 14th Governor of Tennessee; he later died in the house. It remained in the family; by the 1982, it was owned by his great-granddaughter, Mary Williamson Thomas. It has been listed on the National Register of Historic Places since April 15, 1982.

References

Houses on the National Register of Historic Places in Tennessee
Greek Revival architecture in Tennessee
Houses completed in 1835
Houses in Wilson County, Tennessee
Governor of Tennessee